Dragalina may refer to:
Dragalina, Călărași, a commune in Romania
Dragalina, a village in Cristinești Commune, Botoșani County, Romania
Dragalina, a village in Hlipiceni Commune, Botoșani County, Romania
Tutova, Vaslui, a commune in Vaslui County, Romania
Corneliu Dragalina
Ion Dragalina